Intercon Security, Ltd. was a global security solution provider with Canadian headquarters in Toronto, Ontario, Vancouver, British Columbia, and Calgary, Alberta, as well as Chicago, Illinois.  It provided services for a wide range of organizations and individuals. Over 2,500 security personnel were employed worldwide in various roles ranging from uniformed Security Officers to biometric system installation and analysis.

In the early 2000’s, Intercon kept its name while it transitioned through different parent companies.  It was owned by Tyco Solutions, and in late 2000’s, it was purchased by ADT Security.

Intercon Security is no longer in operation.

Training 
Intercon Security Ltd. offered in-house training to their staff at no cost.  They also were contracted by external agencies to provide security training.  Their instructors were certified in various use of force options, First Aid and CPR, and other services.  It is noted that in British Columbia, security guards were prohibited from carrying batons.

Basic Security Training

Upon hire, security guards were required to complete a 40 hour basic security training course that covered report writing, legislation (Criminal Code of Canada and Trespass to Property Act), fire systems and protection, and legal responsibilities.

First Aid and CPR

Security Guards were required to complete first aid training and maintain current certification while employed. ISL instructors were certified as St John’s Ambulance first aid instructors.

Communications

This 8 hour course focused on using words to deescalate subjects in crisis.  Security guards were trained in using key phrases and verbal tactics to illicit compliance in subjects.

Basic Self Defence and Handcuffing

This 16 hour training course involved in class learning about Criminal Code legislation on powers of arrest, use of force, excessive force, and Trespass to Property Act.  Once security staff successfully completed their knowledge exam, they completed Monadnock Pressure Point Control Techniques, basic open hand strikes, take-down techniques, passive handcuffing, and resistant handcuffing.  Once they demonstrated the skill, they completed a scenario based assessment where the instructors simulated various scenarios where the guard had to assess the situation and respond appropriately.  The training was rigorous and students would fail the course if they could not safely demonstrate the skills.  Security guards were required to recertify annually.

Advanced Self Defence and Baton

This 16 hour course involved more advanced open hand strikes, blocks, take downs, and baton strikes.  Initially, students were trained in Monadnock PR-24 side handled baton, however in 2008 they transitioned to the ASP collapsible baton.  This training also involved in class review of legislation and examination, physical training and competency exam, and scenario based training. Security guards were required to recertify annually.

Tactical Ground Defence

This course introduced security guards to self defence training in the event they were knocked to the ground by an assaultive subject and how to block and defend against attacks. 

Edged Weapons Defence

This course introduced security guards to self defence training involving assaultive subjects armed with knives and how to block and defend against knife attacks.

Firearms Training

Armed security guards received firearms training from firearms instructors with local police agencies certified by the Chief Firearms Officers in their jurisdiction. 

Municipal Law Enforcement Officer 

Security staff could opt to receive training from local by-law or law enforcement agencies to write parking infraction notices to vehicles parked illegally on contracted sites.  The MLEO training was provided by the municipality and gave the security guard Provincial Offences Officer status and the authority to enforce municipal parking bylaws on private property.

Services 
General Assignment Group Low profile security guards (dressed in grey slacks and dark blue blazers) and high profile security guards (dressed in black tactical pants and white uniform shirt) were assigned to general security patrol and access control duties. These guards were typically only received basic security training, first aid and CPR, and basic self defence and handcuffing.
Special Services Group  High profile security guards (dressed in black tactical pants, white uniform shirt and black ballistic vest) trained in use of force options such as pressure point control techniques, basic and advance self defence, handcuffing, ASP collapsible baton (formerly Monadnock PR-24 side handled baton), edged weapons defence, and tactical ground defence. These guards were deployed in higher risk environments.
Protective Services Division  Mobile patrol security guards trained in use of force were responsible for quick alarm response and assisting accounts in need of special assistance or short term requests.
Armed Guard Services  Intercon offered armed guard services for jewellery stores and cash escorts with the Toronto Transit Commission. These guards were trained in the above use of force options, as well as semi-automatic pistol retention and lethal force. They also conducted close protection assignments for VIPs.
Alarm Monitoring  Intercon offered 24 hour alarm monitoring services and was known for their alarm response times.
Alarm Installation and Service  Intercon offered installation services for commercial, industrial and residential intrusion alarms, panic alarms, fire alarms, and closed circuit television systems.

Private Investigator
Consulting

See also
Security Officer

References

Security companies of Canada